Arturo Ruffa (born December 25, 1926 in Tucumán - died October 2004) was an Argentine basketball player who competed in the 1948 Summer Olympics when Argentina finished 15th.

References

1926 births
2004 deaths
Argentine men's basketball players
Olympic basketball players of Argentina
Basketball players at the 1948 Summer Olympics
Sportspeople from Tucumán Province